In mathematics and signal processing, the Z-transform converts a discrete-time signal, which is a sequence of real or complex numbers, into a complex frequency-domain (z-domain or z-plane) representation.

It can be considered as a discrete-time equivalent of the Laplace transform (s-domain). This similarity is explored in the theory of time-scale calculus.

Whereas the continuous-time Fourier transform is evaluated on the Laplace s-domain's imaginary line, the discrete-time Fourier transform is evaluated over the unit circle of the z-domain. What is roughly the s-domain's left half-plane, is now the inside of the complex unit circle; what is the z-domain's outside of the unit circle, roughly corresponds to the right half-plane of the s-domain.

One of the means of designing digital filters is to take analog designs, subject them to a bilinear transform which maps them from the s-domain to the z-domain, and then produce the digital filter by inspection, manipulation, or numerical approximation. Such methods tend not to be accurate except in the vicinity of the complex unity, i.e. at low frequencies.

History 
The basic idea now known as the Z-transform was known to Laplace, and it was re-introduced in 1947 by W. Hurewicz and others as a way to treat sampled-data control systems used with radar. It gives a tractable way to solve linear, constant-coefficient difference equations. It was later dubbed "the z-transform" by Ragazzini and Zadeh in the sampled-data control group at Columbia University in 1952.

The modified or advanced Z-transform was later developed and popularized by E. I. Jury.

The idea contained within the Z-transform is also known in mathematical literature as the method of generating functions which can be traced back as early as 1730 when it was introduced by de Moivre in conjunction with probability theory.
From a mathematical view the Z-transform can also be viewed as a Laurent series where one views the sequence of numbers under consideration as the (Laurent) expansion of an analytic function.

Definition
The Z-transform can be defined as either a one-sided or two-sided transform. (Just like we have the one-sided Laplace transform and the two-sided Laplace transform.)

Bilateral Z-transform 
The bilateral or two-sided Z-transform of a discrete-time signal  is the formal power series  defined as

Unilateral Z-transform 

In signal processing, this definition can be used to evaluate the Z-transform of the unit impulse response of a discrete-time causal system.

The properties of Z-transforms (below) have useful interpretations in the context of probability theory.

Inverse Z-transform
The inverse Z-transform is

where C is a counterclockwise closed path encircling the origin and entirely in the region of convergence (ROC).

A special case of this contour integral occurs when C is the unit circle.  This contour can be used when the ROC includes the unit circle, which is always guaranteed when  is stable, that is, when all the poles are inside the unit circle. With this contour, the inverse Z-transform simplifies to the inverse discrete-time Fourier transform, or Fourier series, of the periodic values of the Z-transform around the unit circle:

The Z-transform with a finite range of n and a finite number of uniformly spaced z values can be computed efficiently via Bluestein's FFT algorithm.  The discrete-time Fourier transform (DTFT)—not to be confused with the discrete Fourier transform (DFT)—is a special case of such a Z-transform obtained by restricting z to lie on the unit circle.

Region of convergence
The region of convergence (ROC) is the set of points in the complex plane for which the Z-transform summation converges.

Example 1 (no ROC)
Let .  Expanding x[n] on the interval (−∞, ∞) it becomes

Looking at the sum

Therefore, there are no values of z that satisfy this condition.

Example 2 (causal ROC)

Let  (where u is the Heaviside step function).  Expanding x[n] on the interval (−∞, ∞) it becomes

Looking at the sum

The last equality arises from the infinite geometric series and the equality only holds if  < 1, which can be rewritten in terms of z as  > 0.5.  Thus, the ROC is  > 0.5.  In this case the ROC is the complex plane with a disc of radius 0.5 at the origin "punched out".

Example 3 (anti causal ROC)

Let  (where u is the Heaviside step function).  Expanding x[n] on the interval (−∞, ∞) it becomes

Looking at the sum

Using the infinite geometric series, again, the equality only holds if  < 1 which can be rewritten in terms of z as  < 0.5. Thus, the ROC is  < 0.5. In this case the ROC is a disc centered at the origin and of radius 0.5.

What differentiates this example from the previous example is only the ROC.  This is intentional to demonstrate that the transform result alone is insufficient.

Examples conclusion
Examples 2 & 3 clearly show that the Z-transform X(z) of x[n] is unique when and only when specifying the ROC. Creating the pole–zero plot for the causal and anticausal case show that the ROC for either case does not include the pole that is at 0.5. This extends to cases with multiple poles: the ROC will never contain poles.

In example 2, the causal system yields an ROC that includes  = ∞ while the anticausal system in example 3 yields an ROC that includes  = 0.

In systems with multiple poles it is possible to have a ROC that includes neither  = ∞ nor  = 0. The ROC creates a circular band. For example,

has poles at 0.5 and 0.75. The ROC will be 0.5 <  < 0.75, which includes neither the origin nor infinity. Such a system is called a mixed-causality system as it contains a causal term (0.5)nu[n] and an anticausal term −(0.75)nu[−n−1].

The stability of a system can also be determined by knowing the ROC alone.  If the ROC contains the unit circle (i.e.,  = 1) then the system is stable.  In the above systems the causal system (Example 2) is stable because  > 0.5 contains the unit circle.

Let us assume we are provided a Z-transform of a system without a ROC (i.e., an ambiguous x[n]). We can determine a unique x[n] provided we desire the following:
 Stability
 Causality

For stability the ROC must contain the unit circle. If we need a causal system then the ROC must contain infinity and the system function will be a right-sided sequence. If we need an anticausal system then the ROC must contain the origin and the system function will be a left-sided sequence. If we need both stability and causality, all the poles of the system function must be inside the unit circle.

The unique x[n] can then be found.

Properties

Parseval's theorem

Initial value theorem: If x[n] is causal, then

Final value theorem: If the poles of (z − 1)X(z) are inside the unit circle, then

Table of common Z-transform pairs
Here:

is the unit (or Heaviside) step function and

is the discrete-time unit impulse function (cf Dirac delta function which is a continuous-time version). The two functions are chosen together so that the unit step function is the accumulation (running total) of the unit impulse function.

Relationship to Fourier series and Fourier transform

And the bi-lateral transform reduces to a Fourier series:

which is also known as the discrete-time Fourier transform (DTFT) of the  sequence.  This 2-periodic function is the periodic summation of a Fourier transform, which makes it a widely used analysis tool.  To understand this, let  be the Fourier transform of any function, whose samples at some interval, T, equal the x[n] sequence.  Then the DTFT of the x[n] sequence can be written as follows.

When T has units of seconds,  has units of hertz. Comparison of the two series reveals that    is a normalized frequency with unit of radian per sample.

As parameter T changes, the individual terms of  move farther apart or closer together along the f-axis.  In  however, the centers remain 2 apart, while their widths expand or contract.  When sequence x(nT) represents the impulse response of an LTI system, these functions are also known as its frequency response.  When the  sequence is periodic, its DTFT is divergent at one or more harmonic frequencies, and zero at all other frequencies.  This is often represented by the use of amplitude-variant Dirac delta functions at the harmonic frequencies.  Due to periodicity, there are only a finite number of unique amplitudes, which are readily computed by the much simpler discrete Fourier transform (DFT).  (See .)

Relationship to Laplace transform

Bilinear transform

The bilinear transform can be used to convert continuous-time filters (represented in the Laplace domain) into discrete-time filters (represented in the Z-domain), and vice versa. The following substitution is used:

to convert some function  in the Laplace domain to a function  in the Z-domain (Tustin transformation), or

from the Z-domain to the Laplace domain.  Through the bilinear transformation, the complex s-plane (of the Laplace transform) is mapped to the complex z-plane (of the z-transform).  While this mapping is (necessarily) nonlinear, it is useful in that it maps the entire  axis of the s-plane onto the unit circle in the z-plane. As such, the Fourier transform (which is the Laplace transform evaluated on the  axis) becomes the discrete-time Fourier transform.  This assumes that the Fourier transform exists; i.e., that the  axis is in the region of convergence of the Laplace transform.

Starred transform 

Given a one-sided Z-transform, X(z), of a time-sampled function, the corresponding starred transform produces a Laplace transform and restores the dependence on sampling parameter, T:

The inverse Laplace transform is a mathematical abstraction known as an impulse-sampled function.

Linear constant-coefficient difference equation
The linear constant-coefficient difference (LCCD) equation is a representation for a linear system based on the autoregressive moving-average equation.

Both sides of the above equation can be divided by α0, if it is not zero, normalizing α0 = 1 and the LCCD equation can be written

This form of the LCCD equation is favorable to make it more explicit that the "current" output y[n] is a function of past outputs y[n − p], current input x[n], and previous inputs x[n − q].

Transfer function
Taking the Z-transform of the above equation (using linearity and time-shifting laws) yields

and rearranging results in

Zeros and poles
From the fundamental theorem of algebra the numerator has M roots (corresponding to zeros of H) and the denominator has N roots (corresponding to poles).  Rewriting the transfer function in terms of zeros and poles

where qk is the kth zero and pk is the kth pole.  The zeros and poles are commonly complex and when plotted on the complex plane (z-plane) it is called the pole–zero plot.

In addition, there may also exist zeros and poles at z = 0 and z = ∞. If we take these poles and zeros as well as multiple-order zeros and poles into consideration, the number of zeros and poles are always equal.

By factoring the denominator, partial fraction decomposition can be used, which can then be transformed back to the time domain.  Doing so would result in the impulse response and the linear constant coefficient difference equation of the system.

Output response
If such a system H(z) is driven by a signal X(z) then the output is Y(z) = H(z)X(z).  By performing partial fraction decomposition on Y(z) and then taking the inverse Z-transform the output y[n] can be found.  In practice, it is often useful to fractionally decompose  before multiplying that quantity by z to generate a form of Y(z) which has terms with easily computable inverse Z-transforms.

See also
 Advanced Z-transform
 Bilinear transform
 Difference equation (recurrence relation)
 Discrete convolution
 Discrete-time Fourier transform
 Finite impulse response
 Formal power series
 Generating function
 Generating function transformation
 Laplace transform
 Laurent series
 Least-squares spectral analysis
 Probability-generating function
 Star transform
 Zak transform
 Zeta function regularization

References

Further reading
 Refaat El Attar, Lecture notes on Z-Transform, Lulu Press, Morrisville NC, 2005. .
 Ogata, Katsuhiko, Discrete Time Control Systems 2nd Ed, Prentice-Hall Inc, 1995, 1987. .
 Alan V. Oppenheim and Ronald W. Schafer (1999). Discrete-Time Signal Processing, 2nd Edition, Prentice Hall Signal Processing Series. .

External links
 
 Numerical inversion of the Z-transform
 Z-Transform table of some common Laplace transforms
 Mathworld's entry on the Z-transform
 Z-Transform threads in Comp.DSP
 A graphic of the relationship between Laplace transform s-plane to Z-plane of the Z transform
 A video-based explanation of the Z-Transform for engineers
 What is the z-Transform?

Transforms
Laplace transforms